Edgar Palacios Rodriguez (born October 7, 1940, Loja), known as Edgar Palacios, is an Ecuadorian music composer.

Palacios has composed over 150 songs, including social songs, hymns for institutions, marching songs for young people, and other type of songs. He has recorded 40 albums of light and classic Ecuadorian music, as well as patriotic songs. He has conducted in over 2,000 concerts. One of his best known albums is the 5-disc collection titled "Edgar Palacios en Concierto".

Edgar Palacios was awarded the Premio Eugenio Espejo in 2006 for his contribution to the cultural heritage of Ecuador.

References

External links 
 Edgar Palacios Rodriguez, diccionariobiograficoecuador.com
 “Loja pasion por la musica“: Edgar Palacios 14-03-2013

Ecuadorian musicians
Ecuadorian composers
People from Loja, Ecuador
1940 births
Living people